Transmembrane and coiled-coil domains 2 is a protein that in humans is encoded by the TMCO2 gene.

References

Further reading